Tunuyán Department is a  department located on the eastern border of Mendoza Province in Argentina.

Districts

Campo de los Andes
Colonia Las Rosas
El Algarrobo
El Totoral
La Primavera
Las Pintadas
Los Árboles
Los Chacales
Los Sauces
Tunuyán
Villa Seca
Vista Flores

External links
Municipal Website (Spanish)

Populated places established in 1880
Departments of Mendoza Province
1880 establishments in Argentina